Tino Boos (born April 10, 1975 in Düsseldorf, West Germany) is a former German professional ice hockey player. He most recently played with the Düsseldorfer EG of the Deutsche Eishockey Liga (DEL).

Playing career
Boos began his career with the Düsseldorfer EG in 1992/93, becoming German champion in the first year. In 1994, he then switched to the Kassel Huskies, because he did not get enough playing time in Düsseldorf. At the 1993 Under-18 European and the 1995 Junior World championship, however, he was one of the most important players for Germany. In 2000, he left Kassel and joined the Kölner Haie in Cologne. He has been the assistant captain for the Sharks since 2000.

Boos after the 06-07 season, was thinking about a move to an NHL team. With a pursuing contract, he looked to sign with the Buffalo Sabres or San Jose Sharks to be with fellow German player Marcel Goc but eventually stayed in Germany and played four seasons from the 07-08 season with the Hannover Scorpions.

Career statistics

Regular season and playoffs

International

References

External links

1975 births
DEG Metro Stars players
Düsseldorfer EG players
German ice hockey centres
Hannover Scorpions players
Ice hockey players at the 2006 Winter Olympics
Kassel Huskies players
Kölner Haie players
Living people
Olympic ice hockey players of Germany
Sportspeople from Düsseldorf